Akaki Gogia (born 18 January 1992) is a professional footballer who plays as a midfielder for Dynamo Dresden. He began his career in Germany with VfL Wolfsburg, before signing for Hallescher FC in 2013 and moving to England to join Brentford in 2015. He returned to Germany with Union Berlin in 2017 and moved to Switzerland to join FC Zürich in 2021. He transferred to Dynamo Dresden in 2022. Born in Georgia, Gogia won international youth caps for Germany at U18 and U19 level. His nickname is "Andy".

Club career

VfL Wolfsburg
A midfielder, Gogia began his career in Germany as a junior with FSV 67 Halle and Hannover 96, before transferring to VfL Wolfsburg in 2004. He came through the youth ranks and made his reserve team debut in February 2010, going on to make 9 appearances. He scored prolifically for Wolfsburg's U17 and U19 teams, scoring a total of 44 goals in 86 appearances and contributing to the team's 2010–11 U19 Bundesliga win, in which he scored in the final.

Along with three other reserve players, Gogia was promoted to the first team squad in December 2010 by general manager Dieter Hoeness and coach Steve McClaren, who dropped Karim Ziani and Caiuby to the reserves. After being included in the party for a winter training camp in Marbella, Gogia was called into the senior squad for the first time for a Bundesliga match versus Bayern Munich on 15 January 2011. He remained an unused substitute during the 1–1 draw and was called up twice more during the 2010–11 season.

On 11 May 2012, it was announced that Gogia had joined Bundesliga club FC Augsburg on loan for the 2011–12 and 2012–13 seasons. He made the first professional appearance of his career when he came on as a substitute for Marcel Ndjeng in a 2–1 DFB-Pokal first round win over Rot-Weiß Oberhausen on 30 July 2011. He made 14 appearances during his spell, which was cut short by torn ligaments in his left knee.

In July 2012, Gogia joined 2. Bundesliga club FC St. Pauli on loan for the 2012–13 season. He made 24 appearances and scored once before returning to Wolfsburg at the end of the season. Gogia departed VfL Wolfsburg in July 2013.

Hallescher FC
In July 2013, Gogia dropped down the 3. Liga to sign for hometown club Hallescher FC on a two-year contract. He made 81 appearances and scored 26 goals during his two seasons with the club. Gogia finished the club's 2014–15 Saxony-Anhalt Cup campaign as the tournament's joint-top scorer and scored in a 6–0 rout of neighbours VfL Halle 1896 in the final.

Brentford
On 16 May 2015, it was announced that Gogia had signed a "long term" contract with English Championship club Brentford on a free transfer. He missed almost all of September 2015 with a thigh injury and after a change of manager and system in early October, Gogia dropped out of the starting lineup and out of the squad altogether by December, save for two substitute appearances in January 2016. A further injury in March 2016 kept him on the sidelines, but he returned to make four substitute appearances in April and finished the season with 14 appearances.

After finding himself far down the midfield pecking order at the end of the 2016–17 pre-season, Gogia joined 2. Bundesliga club Dynamo Dresden on loan for the duration of the 2016–17 season, with an option to buy. He broke into the starting lineup and scored 7 goals in 17 appearances before suffering an ankle ligament injury during a league match versus 1. FC Nürnberg on 29 January 2017. Gogia returned to match play on 10 April and finished his spell with 10 goals in 24 appearances. He was reported by Kicker to have statistically been the best 2. Bundesliga player during the 2016–17 season. On 30 June 2017, Gogia joined the club on a permanent contract for an undisclosed fee (rumoured to be €750,000), but remained for just 24 hours before departing.

Union Berlin
On 1 July 2017, Gogia joined 2. Bundesliga club Union Berlin on a four-year contract. He made 22 appearances and scored two goals during the 2017–18 season and was a part of the squad which was promoted to the Bundesliga via the 2019 Bundesliga relegation play-offs. On his third appearance of the 2019–20 season, in a league match versus Eintracht Frankfurt on 27 September 2019, Gogia suffered a season-ending anterior cruciate ligament injury. He recovered to make 8 appearances during the 2020–21 season and was released when his contract expired. Gogia made 64 appearances and scored 8 goals during four seasons at the Stadion An der Alten Försterei.

FC Zürich 
On 28 July 2021, Gogia signed a two-year contract with Swiss Super League club FC Zürich on a free transfer. He made 17 appearances and scored four goals during the club's Swiss Super League championship-winning 2021–22 season. After making just three appearances during the opening six weeks of the 2022–23 season, Gogia had his contract terminated by mutual consent on 29 August 2022. He made 21 appearances and scored four goals during 13 months at the Letzigrund.

Return to Dynamo Dresden 
On 29 August 2022, Gogia returned to Dynamo Dresden and signed a two-year contract with the 3. Liga club.

International career
Gogia won seven caps for Germany at U18 and U19 level and scored once in a 2–1 friendly defeat to Belgium on 25 March 2011. In May 2015, it was reported that Georgia had contacted Gogia about a call up.

Personal life
Gogia was born in Rustavi, Georgia and moved to Halle, Germany with his parents at the age of 9 in 2001. His parents later moved to Hanover and then Augsburg, which influenced his moves to Hannover 96 and FC Augsburg.

Career statistics

Honours
Hallescher FC
 Saxony-Anhalt Cup: 2014–15

Union Berlin
 Bundesliga relegation play-offs: 2019
FC Zürich

 Swiss Super League: 2021–22

References

External links
 
 
 
 

1992 births
Living people
People from Rustavi
German people of Georgian descent
Georgian emigrants to Germany
Naturalized citizens of Germany
Association football wingers
German footballers
Germany youth international footballers
Footballers from Georgia (country)
German expatriate footballers
German expatriate sportspeople in England
Expatriate footballers in England
Expatriate footballers from Georgia (country)
Expatriate footballers in Germany
Bundesliga players
2. Bundesliga players
3. Liga players
Regionalliga players
English Football League players
Hannover 96 players
VfL Wolfsburg players
FC Augsburg players
FC St. Pauli players
Hallescher FC players
Brentford F.C. players
Dynamo Dresden players
1. FC Union Berlin players
FC Zürich players
Swiss Super League players